Suman Kalyanpur (born as Suman Hemmadi; 28 January 1937) is an Indian playback singer, one of the best-known and most respected playback singers in India.

Her voice was often mistaken to be that of Lata Mangeshkar. Suman Kalyanpur's career started in 1954 and was very popular singer in the 1960s and 1970s. She recorded songs for movies in several languages besides Hindi, Marathi, Assamese, Gujarati, Kannada, Maithili, Bhojpuri, Rajasthani, Bengali, Odia and Punjabi. She is considered among the popular singers of her prime time.

Personal life
Early life
Suman Kalyanpur was born as Suman Hemmadi on 28 January 1937 in Dhaka  (now in Bangladesh). Suman Kalyanpur's father Shankar Rao Hemmadi hailed from a Saraswat Brahmin family belonging to Mangalore. Hemmadi is a village in Kundapur Taluk of Udupi District, Karnataka. He served on a top post in the Central Bank of India and was posted to Dhaka for a very long period. Apart from father and mother Seeta Hemmadi, there were 5 daughters and one son in the family with Suman being the eldest among her siblings. In 1943, her family moved to Mumbai, where she received her musical training.

Suman had always been interested in painting and music. After completing schooling from Mumbai’s famed St. Columba High School, she got admission in the prestigious Sir J. J. School of Arts for further studies in painting. Simultaneously, she started learning classical vocal from Pune's Prabhat Films' music director and a close family friend, Pandit Keshav Rao Bhole. According to Suman, initially singing was just hobby to her but gradually her interest in music increased and she started learning it professionally from Ustad Khan, Abdul Rehman Khan and Guruji Master Navrang. Suman's younger sister Shyama Hemmady was also a singer.

Married life
Suman Hemmady married a Mumbai-based businessman Ramanand Kalyanpur in the 1958 and thus, became Suman Kalyanpur from Suman Hemmady. He accompanied her for every recording session after her marriage. She has a daughter named Charul Agni who is settled in the United States after marriage. Her grand daughter Aaishanni Agny returned to India and opened an NGO in Mumbai in her grand mother's name.

Career

According to Suman, "Everybody at home had an inclination towards arts and music but public performances were strictly prohibited. Still, I could not say 'no' to an offer to sing for the All India Radio in 1952. This was my first public performance after which I got a chance to sing for the Marathi film Shukrachi Chandni released in the year 1953. At that time, Sheikh Mukhtar was making the film Mangu whose composer was Mohammed Shafi. Sheikh Mukhtar was so impressed with my ‘'Shukrachi Chandni'’ songs, that he got me to sing 3 songs for the film ‘Mangu’. However, due to some unknown reasons, later O. P. Nayyar replaced Mohammed Shafi and only one of my three songs, a lullaby "Koi Pukare Dheere Se Tujhe" was retained in the film. Thus, I entered Hindi cinema with the 1954 release "Mangu".

Immediately, after the film "‘Mangu’", Suman sang 5 songs under the baton of composer Naushad for the film Darwaza (1954), which was produced by Ismat Chugtai and directed by Shahid Lateef. Since ‘'Darwaza’' released first, it is generally believed to be Suman Kalyanpur's first Hindi film. In the same year (1954), Suman sang the film version of O.P.Nayyar’s hit ensemble song "Mohabbat Kar Lo Ji Bhar Lo Aji Kisne Roka Hai" with Mohammed Rafi and Geeta Dutt for the film Aar Paar. According to Suman, she had a couple of solo lines to sing and her services were used, more, as a chorus singer in this song. This proved to be the only song she ever sang for O. P. Nayyar.

Suman Kalyanpur's first film song was a duet with Talat Mahmood in Darwaza (1954). Talat Mahmood heard Kalyanpur singing in a musical concert and was highly impressed by her singing. A rank newcomer, her career hit the big league when Talat agreed to sing the duet with her, making the film industry sit up and take notice of her.

She sang for the movie, Mangu (1954), Koi Pukare Dheere Se Tujhe. Kalyanpur provided playback singing for Miyan Bibi Razi (1960), Baat Ek Raat Ki (1962), Dil Ek Mandir (1963), Dil Hi To Hai (1963), Shagoon (1964),  Jahan Ara (1964), Sanjh Aur Savera (1964), Noor Jehan (1967), Saathi (1968) and Pakeezah (1971). She sang for composers Shankar Jaikishan, Roshan, Madan Mohan, S. D. Burman, N Datta, Hemant Kumar, Chitragupta, Naushad, S. N. Tripathi, Ghulam Mohammed, Kalyanji Anandji and Laxmikant–Pyarelal singing the most songs for the first two in the list. She has sung over 740 movie and non-movie songs. She sang over 140 duets with Rafi in the 1960s.

Suman's first song in Marathi was the super-hit "Bhaatuklichaa Khel Maandila" for Vasant Prabhu, for the film Pasant Aahe Mulgi. After that she never looked back for over 20 years. Putra Vhawa Aisaa, Ekti, Manini and Annapoorna were but a few of her memorable films. But even outside films, her hits are legion and include over 50 timeless gems of Marathi films, bhavgeet and bhaktigeet.

Kalyanpur sang with Lata Mangeshkar the duet "Kabhi Aaj, Kabhi Kal, Kabhi Parson" under the direction of composer Hemant Kumar. She recorded some popular duets with male singers Mohammed Rafi, Manna Dey, Mukesh, Talat Mahmood, and Hemant Kumar. Some of her memorable duets with Rafi are "Aajkal Tere Mere Pyaar Ke Charche", "Na Na Karte Pyaar", "Tumse O Hasina", "Rahen Na Rahen Hum", "Parbaton Ke Pedon Par Shaam Ka Basera He", "Ajahuna Aye Balama", "Tumane Pukara Aur Hum Chale Aye", "Bad Muddat Ke Yeh Ghadi Ayee", "Mujhe Yeh Bhool Na", "Dil Ne Phir Yaad Kiya", "Tujhko Dilbari Ki Kasam" and "Chand Takata Hai Idhar". With Manna Dey, she sang the popular duet "Na Jane Kahan Ham The" under the music direction of Dattaram. With Mukesh she has sung many popular duets like `Yeh Kisne Geet Chheda', "Akhiyon ka noor hai tu", "Mera Pyar Bhi Tu Hai", "Dil Ne Phir Yaad Kiya", "Shama Se Koi Kehde", etc.

Kalyanpur also recorded some memorable songs with a classical base, including "Manamohan Man Mein Ho Tumhi", "Mere Sang Ga Gunguna" and "Gir Gayi Re More Mathe Ki Bindiya".

Similarity of voice with Lata Mangeshkar 
Suman Kalyanpur's voice was very similar to the singer, Lata Mangeshkar. Many of her songs are indistinguishable from Lata's style, because she sung with a quality comparable to Lata. Kalyanpur was very uncomfortable regarding the similarity between her voice and Lata's. She had once answered "I was quite influenced by her. In my college days, I used to sing her songs. Meri aawaaz nazuk aur patli thi (My voice was fragile and thin). What could I do? Also when Radio Ceylon relayed the songs, the names were never announced. Even the records sometimes gave the wrong name. Maybe that caused more confusion." In the era of 1950s and 1960s, the period was referred as the golden era of Hindi film music where the time when female playback singing was dominated by the Mangeshkar sisters Lata and Asha Bhosle.

When Lata was not available for recording, or if the producers could not afford her rate of Rs 100 per song, the song used to be sung by Kalyanpur. During the similar period, Lata had refused to sing with Rafi over royalty issues and those songs were recorded by Kalyanpur with Rafi. She sang over 140 duets with Rafi in this period.

Discography

Hindi songs
"Sathi Mere Sathi" (Veerana)
"Na Tum Hamen Jano" (Baat Ek Raat Ki)
"Chhodo, Chhodo Mori Baiyann" (Miya Biwi Razi)
"Dil Gham Se Jal Raha" (Shama)
"Yun Hi Dil Ne Chaha Tha" (Dil Hi To Hai)
"Bujha Diye Hain" (Shagoon)
"Mere Sang Ga" (Janwar)
"Mere Mehboob Na Ja" (Noor Mahal)
"Tum Agar Aa Sako To"' and "Zindagi Doob Gai Dard Ke Toofano Mein" (Ek Sal Pehle)
"Zindagi imtehan leti hai " (Naseeb)
"Jo Ham Pe Guzarti Hai" (Mohabbat Isko Kehten Hain)
"Sharabi Sharabi Yeh Sawan Ka Mausam" (Noor Jehan)
"Behena Ne Bhai Ki Kalai Main" (Resham Ki Dori), for which she was nominated for the Filmfare Best Female Playback Award in 1975.
"Dil Ek Mandir Hai" (Dil Ek Mandir)
"Aajkal Tere Mere Pyaar Ke Charche" from Brahmachari, which was one of her most famous songs, is usually thought to be sung by Lata Mangeshkar but it was in fact sung by her. (The confusion results from the fact that the quality of her voice is similar to Lata Mangeshkar's at times).
"Aansoo ki ek boond hoon main" (Ek Paheli)
"Mera Pyar Bhi Tu Hai Yeh Bahar Bhi Tu Hai" (Saathi)
 "Na Na Karte Pyar" (Jab Jab Phool Khile)
Zindagi zulm sahi ( shagun)

Marathi songs
"Rimjhhim Jharati Shrāwan Dhara"
"Shabda Shabda Japun Thhewa"
"Re Kshanichya Sangateene Mi Ashi Bharawale"
"Keshava Madhava Tuzya Namat Re Godawa"
"Omkar Pradhan Roop Ganeshache"
"Jethe Sagara Dharanee Milate"
"Bhaktichya Phulancha Goad To Suwas"
"Navika Re Vara Vahe Re"
"Ketakichya Banee Tethe Nachala Ga Mor"
"Yaa Laadkya Mulino".
"Samadhi Gheun jayee dnyandev".
"Mrudul Karani Chhedit Tara".
"Savalya Vitthala Tujhya Dari Aale".
"Saang kadhi kalnar tula bhav majhya manat la"
"Nimbonichya zada mage"

Bengali songs
"Ronger Basore"
"Ei Chadro Mollikate"
"Durashar Baluchare"
"Mone Karo Aami Nei"
"Sudhu Swapno Niye"
"Kande Keno Mon"
"Tomar Aakash Theke"
"Badoler Madol Baje Guruguru"
"Aamar Swapno Dekhar Duti Nayon"
"Aakash Ajana Tobu"
"Payer Chinho Niye"
"Dulchere Mon"
"Byatha Hoye Keno Phire Ele Bondhua"
"Bhabis Ne Re Kandhchi Bosey"
"Ekhane Okhane Jekhane Sekhane"
"Dure theko na aaro aaro kache eso"

Kannada songs
"Odanadi Bekendu"
"Hani Hani Heeri Thani Hareya"
"Thallana Nooru bage"

Assamese Song
"Oi Oi Akash Xubo"

Awards
 Received three times the prestigious "Sur Sringar Samsad" award for the best classical song in a Hindi movie.
 2009 – Lata Mangeshkar Award by the Government of Maharashtra
 Ga Di Ma Award by Ga Di Ma Pratishthan
 2022 – Mirchi Music Lifetime Achievement Award
 2023 – Padma Bhushan by the Government of India on 26 January 2023

See also

 List of Indian playback singers

References

External links
 
 Suman Kalyanpur: voice of sweetness
 Portrait at Kamat's Potpourri
 Career Woman

1937 births
Living people
Indian women playback singers
Marathi playback singers
Bollywood playback singers
Hindi-language singers
Tamil playback singers
Telugu playback singers
Kannada playback singers
Marathi-language singers
Bengali-language singers
Gujarati-language singers
Tamil-language singers
Malayalam playback singers
People from Dhaka
Recipients of the Padma Bhushan in arts